Trochetiopsis melanoxylon, the dwarf ebony or St Helena ebony, of the island of Saint Helena is related to Trochetiopsis ebenus but is now extinct. It differed from T. ebenus by having much smaller flowers, sepals hairless on their interior surfaces and leaves densely hairy on both surfaces (T. ebenus is densely hairy only on the lower surfaces of the leaves).

It was last seen when it was collected by Banks and Solander in 1771 on Cook's first voyage. It may once have covered many of the driest slopes of Saint Helena, but appears to have been one of the first casualties of the introduction of the domestic goat by the Portuguese sailors soon after the discovery of Saint Helena in 1502.

See also
Flora of St Helena

References
 Cronk, Q.C.B. (1995) The endemic Flora of St Helena. Anthony Nelson Ltd, Oswestry.

Flora of Saint Helena
Extinct plants
melanoxylon
Plant extinctions since 1500